Princess Caroline may refer to:

Caroline of Ansbach (born 1683), Queen consort of Great Britain and Ireland
Princess Caroline of Great Britain (born 1713)
Caroline Matilda of Great Britain (born 1751), Queen of Denmark and Norway
Caroline of Brunswick (born 1768), who held the title of princess before becoming Queen of the United Kingdom
Princess Caroline of Gloucester (born 1774)
Princess Caroline of Denmark (born 1793)
Caroline Murat (born 1832), daughter of Prince Napoleon Lucien Charles Murat
Princess Caroline Mathilde of Saxe-Coburg and Gotha (born 1912)
Caroline, Princess of Hanover (born 1957), Hereditary Princess of Monaco

See also
 Princess Carolyn, a fictional character from the Netflix animated television series BoJack Horseman